The Hinton Community School District is a rural public school district headquartered in Hinton, Iowa.

The district is completely within southern Plymouth County, and serves the town of Hinton and the surrounding rural areas.

The school mascot is the Blackhawks, and their colors are black and gold.

Ken Slater has been the superintendent since 2020.

Schools
The district operates three schools in one facility in Hinton:
 Hinton Elementary School
 Hinton Intermediate School
 Hinton High School

Hinton High School

Athletics
The Blackhawks compete in the War Eagle Conference in the following sports:
Football
Cross Country
Volleyball
Wrestling
Basketball
Golf
 Boys' 2006 Class 1A State Champions
Track and Field
Baseball
Softball

See also
List of school districts in Iowa
List of high schools in Iowa

References

External links
 Hinton Community School District

School districts in Iowa
Education in Plymouth County, Iowa